Greg Wrenn is an American poet and nonfiction writer from Jacksonville, Florida. He lives in Harrisonburg, Virginia, where he is an assistant professor of English at James Madison University. He received an AB from Harvard University in 2003 and an MFA from Washington University in St. Louis in 2008. At Stanford University from 2010-2016 he was a Wallace Stegner Fellow in Poetry and a Jones Lecturer.

His first book of poems, Centaur, was awarded the Brittingham Prize and published by the University of Wisconsin Press in 2013. His essays and poems have appeared in The New Republic, New England Review, The Rumpus, Beloit Poetry Journal, The American Poetry Review, The Kenyon Review, The Southern Review, The Yale Review, and elsewhere. Wrenn, a certified scuba diver, writes essays primarily about the ocean and is at work on a memoir about the coral reefs of the Raja Ampat archipelago.

Career

Awards
 Brittingham Prize in Poetry for Centaur (2013)
 Stegner Fellowship, Stanford University (2010-2012)

Bibliography
 Centaur (University of Wisconsin Press, 2013)
 Off the Fire Road (Green Tower Press, 2008)

References

Year of birth missing (living people)
Living people
21st-century American poets
Writers from Jacksonville, Florida
Harvard University alumni
Washington University in St. Louis alumni
Stanford University faculty
Stegner Fellows